is a Japanese comedian. He performs boke in the comedy duo Maple Chogoukin. He is represented with Sun Music Production.

Kazlaser's trademarks are known by wearing red clothing with gold hair. He stated that the look was inspired by the 80's anime series Space Cobra. Kazlaser's parents were both civil servants and his family are strawberry farmers.

Filmography

Film
Suicide Squad - Killer Croc (Japanese dub)

TV series

Current appearances

 Occasional appearances

DVD

References

Notes

Sources

Japanese comedians
People from Saitama Prefecture
Doshisha University alumni
Bisexual men
Bisexual comedians
Japanese bisexual people
Japanese LGBT comedians
1984 births
Living people